There will be four qualification tournaments for the 2025 Women's Rugby League World Cup - one for each International Rugby League confederation. This will be the first time teams will need to qualify for the women's rugby league world cup with previous editions having been by invitation only.

Automatic qualification
The eight teams who competed in the 2021 Women's Rugby League World Cup gained automatic qualification for 2025, they are:
 

 
The remaining eight teams will gain qualification through confederation qualification tournaments.

Asia - Pacific

Competitors
Two of the following will qualify:

Europe

Competition
With England and France automatically qualifying for the tournament, there are four other places available between the eight teams. The teams will play in a two group qualifying tournament with the top two in each group going forward to the finals in 2025. 
 
The group draw took place of 22 February 2023.

Group A

Group B

 
The fixture list was announced on 8 March 2023. The matches will be played between September 2023 and May 2024.

Group A

Group B

Americas

Competitors
One of the following will qualify:

Middle East - Africa

Competitors
One of the following will qualify:

Notes

References

 
2025 Women's Rugby League World Cup